Gang Resistance Education And Training, abbreviated G.R.E.A.T., provides a school-based, police officer instructed program that includes classroom instruction and various learning activities. Their intention is to teach the  students to avoid gangs as well as drugs and alcohol.

The program was originally administered by the Bureau of Alcohol, Tobacco and Firearms of the US Department of the Treasury, however, when the ATF was transferred to the United States Department of Justice, it became administered by the Office of Justice Programs of the Bureau of Justice Assistance.

History
GREAT originated through a combined effort of the ATF and the Phoenix Police Department, Phoenix, Arizona. The effort was congressionally supported as part of the ATF's Project Outreach.

The program originally began as a nine lesson middle-school curriculum. In early 1992, The first GREAT Officer Program was conducted in Phoenix, Arizona. In 1993, due to its perceived success, the program was expanded nationwide. Between 1993-98, the program added the Regional Partners, a National Policy Board as well as thousands of trained officers.

In 2000, the program underwent a curriculum review, this being a result of a study conducted by the National Institute of Justice. This review enhanced the original program to 13 interactive, facilitation style lessons and reinforces the skills learned. The new curriculum was piloted in 14 cities nationwide.

From 2006 to 2012, a multi-site program evaluation was conducted. Based on the results of the short- and long-term evaluation, the "program holds promise as a universal gang prevention program." Please look below, under the "Recent Program Evaluation" for further detail of the evaluation and results.

The Goal
To prevent youth crime, violence, and gang involvement while developing a positive relationship among law enforcement, families, and young people to create safer communities.

The Curriculum
Middle School Component: 
The G.R.E.A.T. middle school curriculum is a skills-based curriculum designed to produce knowledge and attitudinal and behavioral changes through the use of facilitative teaching, positive behavior rehearsal, cooperative and interactive learning techniques, and extended teacher activities. The curriculum has integrated National English Language Arts Standards and National Health Education Standards and is based on effective research practices.
The G.R.E.A.T. middle school curriculum was designed for middle school entry-level students in 6th or 7th grade. Taught in the classroom by specially trained, uniformed law enforcement officers, G.R.E.A.T.'s violence prevention curriculum is a life-skills competency program designed to provide students with the skills they need to avoid gang pressure and youth violence. The curriculum can be used in conjunction with other prevention programs encouraging positive relationships among the community, parents, schools, and law enforcement.
The G.R.E.A.T. middle school curriculum consists of thirteen 30- to 45-minute lessons designed to be taught in sequential order:
    1. Welcome to G.R.E.A.T.
    2. What's the Real Deal?
    3. It's About Us
    4. Where Do We Go From Here?
    5. Decisions, Decisions, Decisions
    6. Do You Hear What I Am Saying?
    7. Walk in Someone Else's Shoes
    8. Say It Like You Mean It
    9. Getting Along Without Going Along
    10. Keeping Your Cool
    11. Keeping It Together
    12. Working It Out
    13. G.R.E.A.T. Days Ahead

Elementary School Component:
The G.R.E.A.T. elementary curriculum is a skills-based curriculum designed as a precursor to the middle school curriculum. This component establishes the foundation that prepares children for the intensified content and cooperation exercises taught in the middle school curriculum, while developing a positive bond between law enforcement and youth. Reaching children at an earlier stage of development allows for a better transition into the middle school curriculum. The elementary curriculum has integrated National English Language Arts Standards and National Health Education Standards and is based on effective research practices.
The G.R.E.A.T. elementary curriculum was designed for fourth and fifth grade students. Children who have aggressive behavior in the elementary school years are more likely to display antisocial and violent behavior as adolescents and young adults. By providing prevention programs to students in elementary and middle school, it is believed that such programs have a better chance of affecting the developmental course of the problem behavior.
The G.R.E.A.T. elementary curriculum consists of six 30- to 45-minute lessons designed to be taught in sequence. Each lesson is accompanied by a parent letter that the student takes home explaining the lesson and encouraging parent/student interaction:
    1. G.R.E.A.T. Beginnings
    2. To Do or Not to Do
    3. Loud and Clear
    4. Staying Cool When the Heat Is On
    5. We're All in This Together
    6. G.R.E.A.T. Days Ahead

Officer Selection
Personal Characteristics of a G.R.E.A.T. Instructor: Enthusiastic, Dependable, Enjoys working with children, Flexible, Positive, Comfortable talking with a group of people from diverse backgrounds.

Desired Background: Exemplary work record, Positive role model, Well respected by peers, Well respected by agency management.

Skills: Able to grasp concepts and effectively communicate them both to children and adults, Able to relate well to people, both children and adults, Able to respond well to impromptu questions.

Officer Commitment:
G.R.E.A.T. involves a great deal of personal commitment on the part of the officer(s). It begins with the intensive one-week or two-week training. The training will require many out-of-classroom hours for preparation. All classroom sessions are mandatory for certification. Those who find that they cannot commit to every session need to reenroll for a future available training. Each training participant will be required to make several formal and informal presentations. Failure to meet minimum standards will result in non-certification.

Supervision:
While attending the training, officers will be under the functional supervision of the G.R.E.A.T. supervisor. Minor disciplinary problems will be handled by the supervisor in charge. Major disciplinary problems will be brought to the attention of the involved officer's agency. Major disciplinary problems may result in non-certification of the officer.

Evaluation:
G.R.E.A.T. is a primary duty assignment. Each agency will receive an evaluation of officer performance at the conclusion of the training.

Recent program evaluation

From 2006 to 2012, a multi-site program evaluation was conducted. Approximately 4,000 students attending 31 schools in seven cities compromised the initial sample. 195 classrooms (102 received G.R.E.A.T. and 93 did not receive the program), during the 2006-2007 school year.

Albuquerque, NM; Chicago, IL; a Dallas-Fort Worth area district, TX; Greeley, CO; Nashville, TN; Philadelphia, PA; and Portland, OR

Site selection was driven by the presence of the G.R.E.A.T. program and willingness of the police departments and school districts to agree to the evaluation design. In addition, three main criteria guided site selection: 
1) existence of an established G.R.E.A.T. programs
2) geographic and demographic diversity
3) evidence of gang activity

All students for whom active parental consent was obtained were then asked to participate in the evaluation by completing a confidential group-administered pre-test questionnaire. Upon completion of the G.R.E.A.T. program in each school, students were then requested to complete post-tests and four annual follow-up surveys. 
Survey questions reflected the three main goals of G.R.E.A.T.

There were 28 attitudinal or perceptual measures that address potential outcomes of the G.R.E.A.T. program that were examined

Program effect on five behavioral outcomes were examined:
 delinquency variety 
 delinquency frequency
 violent offending variety 
 violent offending frequency
 gang membership

Results
The results from post-test and one-year follow-up questionnaires showed statistically significant improvements in the following areas:
 More positive attitudes to police 
 More positive attitudes about police in classrooms 
 Less positive attitudes about gangs 
 More use of refusal skills 
 More resistance to peer pressure 
 Higher collective efficacy 
 Less use of hitting neutralizations 
 Fewer associations with delinquent peers 
 Less self-centeredness 
 Less anger 
 Lower rates of gang membership

There were no statistically significant improvements on 15 of the attitudinal measures: empathy, impulsivity, risk-seeking, pro-social peers, negative peer commitment, positive peer commitment, neutralization for theft, guilt, conflict resolution, calming others, active listening, problem solving, self-efficacy, awareness of services, and altruism.

Differences in rates of delinquency (while 7% lower for G.R.E.A.T. students) and violent offending (10% lower for G.R.E.A.T. students) were also not statistically significant. However, the G.R.E.A.T. students had significantly lower odds of belonging to a gang.

Results from analyses of six waves of survey data collected from students in seven U.S. public school districts indicate that the program is meeting its primary objective of preventing gang membership; the analyses indicate a 39 percent reduction in the odds of gang joining one year post-program as well as a 24 percent reduction four years post the program.

Usage in arcade games
In the 1990s, GREAT had a message that appeared in arcade games with an emblem that read "GREAT LIFE: A Most Excellent Adventure Without GANGS" with the "GANGS" part in a crossed-out circle. On the left of the emblem is the Bureau of Alcohol, Tobacco, and Firearms logo with "Steve Higgins Director" under it, and on the right of the emblem is the Phoenix Police Department logo with "Dennis Garrett Chief" under it.

See also
DARE Program

References

External links

Education in the United States
Law enforcement in the United States
Crime prevention
Phoenix Police Department
Gangs in the United States